Elusa incertans is a species of moth of the family Noctuidae. It was described by George Thomas Bethune-Baker in 1906, and is known from New Guinea.

References

Moths described in 1906
Hadeninae
Moths of New Guinea